Indehiscent fruit do not open at maturity in a pre-defined way, but rely on predation or decomposition to release the seeds.

Some, but not all, indehiscent fruits are included in specialized morphological categories such as achene, berry, caryopsis, cypsela, drupe, hesperidium, loment, pepo, pome,  samara, syconium. 

See also: List of plants with dehiscent fruits

Asparagus
Clematis
Cyrtosia
Desmodium
Donatia
Filipendula
Malinae
Malus
Maple
Oreostylidium
Palmorchis
Peanut
Phyllachne
Punica
Raphanus
Rhizanthella
Tamarind

References

Indehiscent fruits
Indehiscent fruit